Events from the year 1712 in Russia

Incumbents
 Monarch – Peter I

Events

Births

Deaths

 
 
 
 
 Ekaterina Alekseyevna Dolgorukova

References

 
Years of the 18th century in Russia